Woollsia is a monotypic genus in the family Ericaceae. The sole species, Woollsia pungens, known as snow heath, is a small shrub found in eastern Australia, from Pigeon House Mountain in southern New South Wales north into Queensland.

Taxonomy
Antonio José Cavanilles described the species as Epacris pungens in 1797, from material collected in the Sydney district. Victorian state botanist Ferdinand von Mueller proposed the new genus Woollsia in 1873, though did not publish its new binomial name until 1875. The genus name honours William Woolls.

Genetic analysis shows that it is an early offshoot of a lineage that includes Lysinema ciliatum and the genus Epacris.

'Snow heath' is a common name.

Distribution and habitat
In the Sydney region, Woollsia pungens grows in heathland with such species as saw banksia (Banksia serrata), mountain devil (Lambertia formosa), grasstree (Xanthorrhoea resinifera), and open sclerophyll forest under such trees as  Sydney peppermint (Eucalyptus piperita), scribbly gum (E. haemastoma) and red bloodwood (Corymbia gummifera).

Ecology
Plants are thought to live 10–20 years in the wild. They are generally killed by bushfire, with new seedlings growing from seed stored in the soil.

Cultivation
In cultivation, it grows best in a part-shaded spot with good drainage and ample moisture. It can be propagated by cuttings or seed.

References

Epacridoideae
Ericales of Australia
Flora of New South Wales
Flora of Queensland
Monotypic Ericaceae genera
Taxa named by Ferdinand von Mueller